Cryptocolliuris pantosi is a species of beetle in the family Carabidae, the only species in the genus Cryptocolliuris.

References

Lebiinae